The scissor-billed koa finch, (Rhodacanthis forfex) or scissor finch is an extinct species of Hawaiian honeycreeper. Of the four species in the genus Rhodacanthis, the scissor-billed koa finch and the primitive koa finch became extinct before the arrival of the first Europeans to Hawaii in 1778. It was endemic to the islands of Maui and Kauai in the Hawaiian Islands.

Diet 

The scissor-billed koa finch was a granivore, that, like the other members of its genus, had a bill adapted to eat the hard seeds and pods of legumes.  Pollen and fossil evidence indicates that Ka palupalu o Kanaloa (Kanaloa kahoolawensis) and koaia (Acacia koaia) were probably important food sources, and it may have eaten caterpillars and aalii (Dodonaea viscosa) berries.

Extinction 
Due to its early extinction, very little is known about this species. It is only known from fossil remains. Other Hawaiian honeycreepers are known to have become extinct or very rare due to habitat loss, introduced predators and avian diseases. It is possible the extinction of the scissor-billed koa finch also involved these factors.

References 

Rhodacanthis
Holocene extinctions
Endemic fauna of Hawaii
Extinct birds of Hawaii
Hawaiian honeycreepers
Late Quaternary prehistoric birds
Taxa named by Helen F. James